Tiéhi is an African surname. Notable people with the surname include:

 Christ Tiéhi (born 1998), Ivorian footballer
 Jean-Pierre Tiéhi (born 2002), French footballer
 Joël Tiéhi (born 1964), Ivorian footballer

Surnames of African origin